The 2011 WCHA Men's Ice Hockey Tournament will be played between March 11 and March 19, 2011 at six conference arenas and the Xcel Energy Center in St. Paul, Minnesota. The winner will receive the Broadmoor Trophy as the tournament's champions, and will be awarded the Western Collegiate Hockey Association's automatic bid to the 2011 NCAA Division I Men's Ice Hockey Tournament.

Format
The first round of the postseason tournament features a best-of-three games format. All twelve conference teams participate in the tournament. Teams are seeded No. 1 through No. 12 according to their final conference standing, with a tiebreaker system used to seed teams with an identical number of points accumulated. The top six seeded teams each earn home ice and host one of the lower seeded teams.

The winners of the first round series advance to the Xcel Energy Center for the WCHA Final Five, the collective name for the quarterfinal, semifinal, and championship rounds. The Final Five uses a single-elimination format. Teams are re-seeded No. 1 through No. 6 according to the final regular season conference standings, with the top two teams automatically advancing to the semifinals.

Conference standings
Note: GP = Games played; W = Wins; L = Losses; T = Ties; PTS = Points; GF = Goals For; GA = Goals Against

Bracket
Teams are reseeded after the first round

Note: * denotes overtime periods

First round

(1) North Dakota vs. (12) Michigan Tech

(2) Denver vs. (11) Minnesota State

(3) Nebraska-Omaha vs. (10) Bemidji State

(4) Minnesota-Duluth vs. (9) St. Cloud State

Note: Game 2 was the 3rd longest game in WCHA History and 12th longest in NCAA history, although not the longest match between these two schools. SCSU defeated UMD in Triple Overtime in Game 3 of their WCHA 1st Round series in 2007, that went 11:13 into triple overtime. This is the 1st time 2 schools have played 2 triple-overtime games vs one another.

(5) Minnesota vs. (8) Alaska-Anchorage

(6) Colorado College vs. (7) Wisconsin

Quarterfinals

(4) Minnesota-Duluth vs. (10) Bemidji State

(6) Colorado College vs. (8) Alaska-Anchorage

Semifinals

(2) Denver vs. (10) Bemidji State

(1) North Dakota vs. (6) Colorado College

Championship

(1) North Dakota vs. (2) Denver

Tournament awards

All-Tournament Team
F Matt Frattin* (North Dakota)
F Anthony Maiani (Denver)
F Jaden Schwartz (Colorado College)
D Matt Donovan (Denver)
D Chay Genoway (North Dakota)
G Sam Brittain (Denver)
* Most Valuable Player(s)

References

External links
Western Collegiate Hockey Association

Wcha Men's Ice Hockey Tournament
WCHA Men's Ice Hockey Tournament